Mehlog or Mah(i)log was a princely state of India before and during the colonial British Raj. The capital city was Patta.

On 15 April 1948 Mahlog acceded to the Indian Union. Later it was merged into the Indian state of Himachal Pradesh.

History 

The native state of Mahlog was founded in 1183. Earlier its rulers were ruling near Kalka (in Haryana) when Mohamad Gauri attacked and they shifted to Mahlog area. The state began with 193 villages and forest land, but at the end over 300 villages were included in it. It was one of the biggest princely states of Simla Hill States under the British Raj. It was subject to Bilaspur State during the late 18th century. From 1803 to 1815 it was occupied by the Gurkhas of Nepal. Thereafter it became a British protectorate.

Rulers 
The rulers of the state bore the title Thakur.

Thakurs

Palace

References

External links and sources 

 
WorldStatesmen - India - Princely States K-Z

Princely states of Himachal Pradesh
Rajput princely states
Forts in Himachal Pradesh
1948 disestablishments in India
States and territories disestablished in 1948
Buildings and structures in Shimla district